Jordan Leslie (born October 31, 1991) is a former American football wide receiver. He played college football at BYU in 2014 and for UTEP in 2012 and 2013. He was signed by the Minnesota Vikings after going undrafted in the 2015 NFL Draft.

Early years
Leslie attended Tomball High School in Tomball, Texas, where he was a three-year varsity letterwinner for coach Tommy Kaiser. He switched from quarterback to wide receiver for his sophomore year and responded by tallying 54 receptions for 770 yards and five touchdowns, earning All-Region Newcomer of the Year. He made 54 catches for 1,014 yards (18.9 avg.) with 10 TDs his junior season while also adding five punt returns for 49 yards (9.8 avg.) and seven kickoff returns for 186 yards (26.6 avg.). As a senior, he compiled 55 catches for 742 yards (13.5 avg.) with nine touchdowns, and also had eight punt returns for 113 yards (14.1 avg.) and seven kickoff returns for 132 yards (18.9 avg.). He was also a three-time Academic All-District pick and also made the Academic All-State team.

Also a standout in basketball and track & field, Leslie was a multiple All-District choice in basketball and a runner-up finisher in the high jump at the 2009 regional meet with a leap of 2.03 meters (6 feet, 8 inches). He also had personal-best leaps of 6.47 meters (21 feet, 2.25 inches) in the long jump and 13.37 meters (43 feet, 10.5 inches) in the triple jump.

In his freshman year, Leslie befriended future professional basketball player Jimmy Butler. They played together on the basketball team. Since Butler was homeless at the time, Leslie's family allowed Butler to live with them.

Professional career

Minnesota Vikings
Leslie was signed by the Minnesota Vikings on May 2, 2015, after going undrafted. He was cut by the Vikings on August 31, 2015.

Jacksonville Jaguars
Leslie signed with the Jacksonville Jaguars' practice squad on October 21, 2015.

Atlanta Falcons
Leslie signed with the Atlanta Falcons' practice squad on December 15, 2015. On August 27, 2016, Leslie was waived by the Falcons.

Tennessee Titans 
Leslie was signed to the Tennessee Titans' practice squad on September 27, 2016. He was released by the team on October 3.

Cleveland Browns
On October 18, 2016, Leslie was signed to the Browns' practice squad. He signed a reserve/future contract with the Browns on January 5, 2017.

On September 2, 2017, Leslie was waived by the Browns. He was re-signed to the practice squad on September 19, 2017. He was promoted to the active roster on September 22, 2017. He caught his first career pass in Week 3, a one-handed leaping grab for 26 yards. He was waived/injured on October 4, 2017 and placed on injured reserve. He was released on October 11, 2017.

Denver Broncos
On December 27, 2017, Leslie was signed to the Denver Broncos' practice squad. He signed a reserve/future contract with the Broncos on January 1, 2018.

On August 31, 2018, Leslie was waived by the Broncos.

Salt Lake Stallions
On December 21, 2018, Leslie signed with the Salt Lake Stallions of the Alliance of American Football.

Hamilton Tiger-Cats
After the AAF ceased operations in April 2019, Leslie signed with the Hamilton Tiger-Cats of the Canadian Football League on May 23, 2019. He asked for his release on May 28.

References

External links
Brigham Young Cougars bio
UTEP Miners bio
Minnesota Vikings bio
Jacksonville Jaguars bio
Atlanta Falcons bio
Cleveland Browns bio

1991 births
Living people
Players of American football from Houston
Players of Canadian football from Houston
UTEP Miners football players
BYU Cougars football players
Minnesota Vikings players
Jacksonville Jaguars players
Atlanta Falcons players
Tennessee Titans players
Cleveland Browns players
Denver Broncos players
Salt Lake Stallions players
Hamilton Tiger-Cats players